Malayozodarion is a genus of spiders in the family Zodariidae. It was first described in 2008 by Ono & Hashim. , it contains only one species, Malayozodarion hoiseni, found in Malaysia.

References

Zodariidae
Monotypic Araneomorphae genera
Spiders of Asia